The 2020–21 season will see Glasgow Warriors compete in the competitions: the Guinness Pro14 and the European Rugby Champions Cup. The Pro14 had been reduced to 12 sides this season due to the covid-19 pandemic, as the South African sides could not take part.

After being unable to fulfil their fixture against Lyon in the Champions Cup, after a number of their players contracted covid-19 and others had to isolate after playing against a covid-hosted Exeter Chiefs side (also in the European Rugby Champions Cup), the Glasgow side were then placed in the European Rugby Challenge Cup.

A further tournament was later announced. The Rainbow Cup was an end of season tournament intended as a precursor to 4 South African Super Rugby Unlocked franchises joining the Pro14 in the following season.

Season overview

The season was dominated by covid-19 pandemic concerns. Due to the pandemic matches were played without fans; and there were strict penalties should a club have to miss a match. For rugby union in Scotland, only the international sides and the two Pro14 sides remained operational. For this to work, the squads had to remain in their own 'bubble' to limit interaction with others and so curtail the spread of covid-19.

The 'bubble' approach largely worked. Glasgow Warriors had one serious outbreak of coronavirus; and that was purely through contact with an English side on the pitch, Exeter Chiefs as they played them in the Champions Cup. However the consequence of the 'bubble' approach was felt more keenly by the Glasgow Warriors when their international players left to play in the international windows of the Autumn Internationals and the Six Nations. The Scotland international squad had its own 'bubble'. That meant the Glasgow Warriors played called up for Scotland could not easily return to the Warriors, if for example, they were not selected for an international match in that window; as was the case in previous seasons.

The pandemic had hindered recruitment for the new head coach Danny Wilson; and the impact of the coronavirus mitigation in place of no fans and the 'bubble' approach with the secondment of players, lowered expectations of what the Warriors could achieve this season, especially as most expected this to be a rebuilding season without the pandemic in the background. However this was still Glasgow Warriors, and even on lower seasonal expectations there was still a demand that the club be competitive and provide a challenge to other top sides.

Player discipline during matches turned out to be a key factor in the Glasgow Warriors season. This meant that the Warriors did not challenge for the top honours in the Pro14 but had to be content in securing Champions Cup qualification for the following season. After the Warriors were dumped out of this season's coronavirus hit Champions Cup and instead placed in the Challenge Cup's last 16, discipline remained a problem; a red card to TJ Ioane, who was subsequent given a five-match ban, saw the 14-man Warriors edged out by Montpellier.

By the end of the season; and with 18 players leaving the side, including club legends Chris Fusaro (183 caps), Tommy Seymour (150 caps), Leone Nakarawa (80 caps) and Niko Matuwalu (138 caps) among stalwarts like Alex Allan (109 caps), Lee Jones (92 caps) and D'Arcy Rae (86 caps) and stars like Huw Jones (49 caps) and Adam Hastings (52 caps), the rebuilding that many predicted proved accurate.

Some new signings to replace the departures have been announced but in the promotion of academy prospects like Ross Thompson, Rufus McLean, Ollie Smith and Tom Lambert, the appearance of Gregor Brown, and the arrival and impact of other new boys Cole Forbes and Rory Darge have gave the season end a much better report than would otherwise been the case. In the end of season tournament, the Rainbow Cup, although initially stung by the Northern Hemisphere's eventual finalist Benetton Treviso in a surprise upsurge in their form, the Warriors won the next four matches in a row, securing the 1872 Cup in the process and beating this season's Pro14 winners Leinster in their last match of the tournament.

Forbes, Darge, McLean and Thompson were subsequently called up by Scotland for their summer international matches, alongside other Warriors like Kiran Macdonald, Jamie Dobie, George Horne and Kyle Steyn. Incoming signings for next season like Jamie Bhatti and Sione Tuipoluto were also selected. Ross Thompson secured the Warriors Young Player of the Season award; in a season where he made his competitive debut in January 2021 he broke the 100 points milestone the same season. He became only the fourth Glasgow Warrior in history to do so in his debut season; and the third fastest, behind only Tommy Hayes and Dan Parks and ahead of Calvin Howarth.

A season which started poorly ended with good progress in the end; and optimism for the coming season is apparent.

Team

Coaches

Head coach:  Danny Wilson 
Assistant coach:  Kenny Murray
Assistant coach:  Peter Murchie (from March 2021)
Assistant coach:  Kelly Brown (to February 2021)
Scrum coach:  Petrus du Plessis (to October 2020)
Attack coach:  Jonny Bell
 Head strength and conditioning coach:  Brad Mayo (to Jan 2021)
 Head strength and conditioning coach:  Cillian Reardon (from Feb 2021)
 Assistant strength and conditioning coach:  Liam Walshe
 Assistant strength and conditioning coach:  Jonathan Harris-Wright 
 Assistant strength and conditioning coach:  Tom Savage
 Lead performance analyst: Greg Woolard
 Assistant performance analyst: Graham O'Riordan

Squad

Scottish Rugby Academy Stage 3 players

These players are given a professional contract by the Scottish Rugby Academy. Although given placements they are not contracted by Glasgow Warriors. Players graduate from the Academy when a professional club contract is offered.

These players are assigned to Glasgow Warriors for the season 2020–21.

Academy players promoted in the course of the season are listed with the main squad.

  Murphy Walker – Prop
  Angus Fraser – Hooker
  Alex Samuel – Lock
  Max Williamson – Lock
  Gregor Brown – Flanker
  Rory Jackson – Flanker
  Euan Cunningham – Fly-half
  Michael Gray – Centre
  Robbie McCallum – Centre
  Connor de Bruyn – Centre
  Finlay Callaghan – Wing
  Ollie Melville – Full-back

Back up players

Other players used by Glasgow Warriors over the course of the season.

  Robbie Fergusson (Scotland 7s) – Centre
  Caleb Korteweg (Stirling County) – Scrum-half
  Jordan Lenac (Ayrshire Bulls) – Scrum-half
  Will Hurd – Prop
  Tom Brown (Scotland 7s) – Full Back
  Harvey Elms (Scotland 7s) – Full Back

Player statistics

During the 2020–21 season, Glasgow have used 55 different players in competitive games. The table below shows the number of appearances and points scored by each player.

Staff movements

Coaches

Personnel in
  Danny Wilson from  Scotland
  Jonny Bell from  Gloucester
  Kelly Brown from  Saracens
  Cillian Reardon from  Leinster
  Peter Murchie from  Ayrshire Bulls

Personnel out
  Dave Rennie to  Australia
 
  John Dalziel to  Scotland (forwards coach)
  Petrus du Plessis to  Australia (scrum coach)
  Brad Mayo to  ACT Brumbies (performance manager)
  Kelly Brown released

Some coaches from the various Scotland set-ups were helping at the club during the covid pandemic:

  Shade Munro – forwards
  Gary Strain – scrum

Medical

Personnel in

Personnel out

Staff

Personnel in

Personnel out

Player movements

Academy promotions

  Rufus McLean from Scottish Rugby Academy
  Ross Thompson from Scottish Rugby Academy
  Ollie Smith from Scottish Rugby Academy
  Tom Lambert from Scottish Rugby Academy

Player transfers

In

 
 
  Hamish Bain from  Stade Niçois
 
 
  (loan)

Out

  Jonny Gray to  Exeter Chiefs
  Cameron Henderson to  Leicester Tigers
  Nick Frisby released
  Siua Halanukonuka to  Perpignan
  D. T. H. van der Merwe released
  Rory Hughes released
  Matt Smith retired  Ruaridh Jackson retired'''
  Callum Gibbins released  Tim Swinson to  Saracens
  Andrew Davidson to  Edinburgh Rugby
  Marshall Sykes to  Edinburgh Rugby
  Adam Ashe released  Charlie Capps released  Bruce Flockhart sabbatical  Jale Vakaloloma released  Brandon Thomson to  Cheetahs
  (loan ends)
  Will Hurd to  Leicester Tigers
 
  Adam Nicol to  Jersey Reds
  Tommy Seymour retired

Competitions
Pre-season and friendlies

There was no friendly matches this season; however Glasgow Warriors and Edinburgh did play a closed doors 'A' match. Edinburgh released a squad 23, however Glasgow Warriors did not release player information. The Offside Line'' stated that Glasgow planned to treat the match purely as training match and rotate a large squad throughout the game. There were however limited video highlights which meant that Warriors fans could determine the probable squad used, listed below. Some player numbers were duplicated by the Glasgow side.

Match 1

Glasgow Warriors: 1 Tom Lambert, 2 Mesu Dolokoto, 3 D'Arcy Rae, 4 Hamish Bain, 5 Max Williamson, 6 Fotu Lokotui, 7 Chris Fusaro, 8 Rory Jackson, 9 Jordan Lenac, 10 Tom Jordan, 11 Robbie Nairn, 12 Stafford McDowall, 13 Harvey Elms, 14 Ollie Melville, 15 Tom Brown
Replacements: 16 Angus Fraser, 17 George Thornton, 18 Adam Nicol, 18 Will Hurd, 19 Harrison Courtney, 20 Gregor Brown, 20 Connor De Bruyn, 21 Kaleem Barreto, 21 Michael Gray, 22 Brandon Thomson, 22 Lomond MacPherson, 23 Robbie McCallum, 23 Finlay Callaghan, Euan Cunningham

Edinburgh: 15. Damien Hoyland, 14. Nathan Sweeney, 13. Matthew Currie, 12. Matt Gordon, 11. Alec Coombes, 10. Nathan Chamberlain, 9. Roan Frostwick, 1. Sam Grahamslaw, 2. Sam Kitchen, 3. Murray McCallum, 4. Mesulame Kunavula, 5. Marshall Sykes, 6. Ally Miller, 7. Connor Boyle CAPTAIN, 8. Ben Muncaster

Replacements: Patrick Harrison, Shaun Gunn, Cole Lamberton, Angus Williams, Rory Darge, Charlie Shiel, Charlie Savala, Cameron Scott, Scott King, Sam Pecqueur

Pro14

This season's Pro14 campaign began with a near traditional away trip to Connacht. The Irish side edged the match; and for the Warriors Tommy Seymour became the first player to score tries in 10 consecutive seasons; and his try in Galway was his 5th opening fixture try. The loss left Warriors Assistant Coach Kenny Murray rueing the Warriors discipline. Better was to follow with Glasgow's home opener with the Scarlets; a dominant first hour of the match enough to secure the win. Danny Wilson said: "Our work at the breakdown and collisions was a lot better than theirs I thought, and our discipline was much improved from last week for the first hour or so. We let our foot off the gas a bit and we’ll look at that, but tonight was all about the win." The Warriors again started well against the Ospreys with tries from Huw Jones and George Turner but failed to convert line-breaks by Nick Grigg and Grant Stewart and a poor second half saw the Welsh side capitalise on Glasgow's missed opportunities to run out winners; the Ospreys first home win in the Pro14 since February 2020.

A tough match was expected against last season's champions Leinster at Scotstoun Stadium. They gave Glasgow Warriors their last league defeat at Scotstoun back in November 2019 and had a better start this season. A young Glasgow side gave a battling performance but lost out to the Irish province; though D'Arcy Rae scored his first try for the Scotstoun side. Wilson took positives from the match: "There’ll be some lessons to learn along the way, but ultimately the fact that we’ve got these young Scottish-qualified players coming through and developing with us can only be a good thing in the long run." Another Irish province with a good start this season was Ulster and the away match was next up. Glasgow were without 18 players; and in the warm-up scrum-half Jamie Dobie suffered a shoulder injury. The Glasgow side was filled with Super 6, Scotland 7s and other players with limited training time. A clinical Ulster side was praised by Wilson but in Glasgow colours he singled out Sean Kennedy and Caleb Korteweg who both filled in at scrum-half. The match against Munster was the third Irish province fixture in a row in the Pro14. The Warriors had 22 players unavailable; indeed they only had 23 full time players available to them for the match, so positionally they called in loan signings TJ Ioane and Lewis Bean, Scotland 7s international Robbie Fergusson and Super 6 Caleb Korteweg to make up the playing squad. However again it was the lack of discipline that let Glasgow down and Munster secured the full points in the last quarter.

Next up was a Welsh double header. The match against Cardiff Blues gave the Warriors their first away win of the season. Peter Horne and Ryan Wilson pulled on the Warriors shirt putting them 3rd equal with Graeme Morrison for the highest Warriors appearances. Danny Wilson said: "We talk a lot about the fight, passion and energy we expect to see when someone pulls on a Warriors jersey and we definitely saw that from the whole team tonight." The match against the Dragons proved more stuffy. The Warriors fielded their oldest starting XV in four years with an average age of 29.0. Brandon Thomson missed the final kick of the match in front of the posts to secure a Warriors victory; Wilson reflected and spread the blame: "We’re not going to put anything on Brandon’s shoulders. We didn’t perform well enough and didn’t put enough points on the board. That’s the story and that’s what we have to focus on."

The Pro14 rescheduled the Round 9 fixtures; as a result the Round 10 match became the first leg of the 1872 Cup. For 8 of the Warriors players, this would be their 1872 Cup debut. This Scottish derby was packed full of Scottish-qualified players; 26 of the 30 players starting were Scottish Qualified; and of the remaining few Edinburgh's Pierre Schoeman would attain his Scottish qualification later that year. Edinburgh won a tight first leg; Wilson stating: "Obviously it’s disappointing to lose, but I thought we looked a bit more like ourselves today. We were adventurous and tried to play some rugby by moving the ball, and we caused Edinburgh problems. It was a game that came down to fine margins and we were on the wrong end of those margins in the end. Our discipline again wasn’t good enough for me, but I’ve got to give credit to our defence tonight. You’ve got to remember that’s a pretty much fully loaded Edinburgh side that went out there today, and they’re a dangerous team. Our defensive effort was excellent today." The Warriors reversed that marginal outcome in the 1872 Cup 2nd leg at home, this time running out victors in another tight match. Wilson noted the performance by young stars Ross Thompson and Rufus McLean; with Thompson in a man of the match performance in his first start for the club. "To come out of the academy and make your first start in a derby is pressure enough as it is, and I thought Ross was outstanding tonight. You need your goal-kicker to step up in tight games like tonight, and he was nearly flawless. The way he played generally was also really pleasing, and he stood up in defence really well – Edinburgh sent big Mata at him a couple of times and he chopped him down. Credit to him, and it’s really pleasing and promising looking long-term. I also thought Rufus stood up really well tonight – he went looking for work and showed up well. It’s a real positive to have these young Scottish talents coming through the system." and summed up: "It was a properly gutsy performance. If I’m honest I feel we deserved to and should have won by more, but that’s nit-picking really. I’m delighted with the effort tonight."

The Warriors match against Benetton was postponed, due to a frozen pitch. Matches against Ulster and Leinster followed. For the Ulster match, veterans Ryan Wilson and Rob Harley had more caps for Glasgow than the combined caps of the rest of the XV. Glasgow got within a score of Ulster and Wilson said: "I thought we played some good rugby and defended well at times. The one thing we need to really improve is control at breakdown which stopped us going through the amount of phases we need to break them down." Ill-discipline proved Warriors undoing against Leinster at the RDS Arena. New signing Cole Forbes was yellow-carded giving away a penalty try in the process; and then Adam Hastings was red-carded; and late in the match TJ Ioane was also yellow-carded. Despite this the Warriors ran in 3 tries and although the understaffed Glasgow side ran out of steam at the end of the match with Leinster securing a 40-21 win, it showed what the Warriors were capable of, if they could get their discipline right.

Coming into Round 14 of the Pro14, the Warriors were sitting 5th in their conference. That was outside the qualification range for next year's European Champions Cup. Dragons were a point below, Zebre a point above, and Ospreys grip on 3rd place was seemingly tight. The Pro14 had confirmed that for this season combined rankings would determine the qualification spots for the Champions Cup. The only thing in Warriors favour was they had to play Zebre, Ospreys and Dragons in their run-in; and still had the postponed Benetton match to play. A good run could see the Warriors clinch the 3rd or 4th spot and eliminate their rivals chances in the process but even that would be ranked alongside the Conference B table. The match against Zebre in Italy saw Glasgow secure a bonus point win, overcoming ill-discipline again which saw the Warriors down to 13 men at one point in the match. Next up was the Ospreys and the Warriors won that with Ross Thompson winning the plaudits in another man of the match performance. After a rainy night in Scotstoun, assistant coach Jonny Bell said: "I thought our set-piece was excellent. It was important that we controlled the game well in conditions like those, and Ross [Thompson] stepped up and ran the show with real maturity. Sean [Kennedy] and Jamie [Dobie] dovetailed well in the second half too, and that gave us the control we needed to be the team on top in that second half. No two ways about it – the next two games are must-wins for us now. We know we’ll need a favour along the way, but all we can control is making sure we get the two wins from those two matches."

Third spot was denied the Warriors when the Ospreys pulled off a miraculous comeback to beat Leinster 24-19, when the Dublin side were winning 19-3 with a little over 20 minutes left to play. Champions Cup hopes were now very slim; and dependent on the Warriors maximising their points from their last 2 matches; together with a run of results going their way in Conference B. A loss away to the Dragons, despite a wonder try by Rufus McLean, meant that 4th spot was now a straight two-way fight between the Dragons and the Warriors in their last matches. The Warriors secured the 5 points in their match against Benetton; leaving Dragons a mountain to climb in their home match against Edinburgh. The Welsh side had to win with a try bonus and with a margin of 45 points; they did win the match, scoring 3 tries in a 24-17 victory. It wasn't nearly enough, and the Warriors took the 4th spot, and it seemed likely that it would secure European Champions Cup qualification for the 15th consecutive season for Glasgow Warriors next season.

League table

Results

Round 1

Round 2

Round 3

Round 4

Round 5

Round 6

Round 7

Round 8

Round 10 – 1872 Cup 1st Leg

Round 9 – 1872 Cup 2nd Leg

Round 11

Round 12

Round 13

Round 14

Round 15

Round 16

Round 11 rescheduled

Europe

Champions Cup

Glasgow Warriors began the European campaign in the European Champions Cup for a 13th consecutive season. They were paired with Exeter Chiefs and Lyon in Pool B. The pairing with Exeter meant that Glasgow would line up with against its departed players; the centurions Glasgow Warrior No. 191 Stuart Hogg and Glasgow Warrior No. 216 Jonny Gray; an ex-captain of the club.

The COVID-19-pandemic affected season was to hurt the Warriors. The first tie was with Exeter Chiefs; and was Glasgow Warrior's 130th European Champions Cup match. England was in the grip of the worst COVID-19 deaths in Europe and the Chiefs team unbeknownst to them was affected with the virus. The Exeter side won the match, but 20 out of the 23 matchday Warriors players were forced to isolate after contracting coronavirus from the English players on the pitch. Head coach Danny Wilson was frustrated with the Warriors display: "We talked all week about how important our discipline was going to be against Exeter, and then we give away 10 penalties in the first half-hour. That led to us being 14 points down despite having the wind at our backs, so when they’ve got the wind they’re just going to pin you in your 22. If you give a side like Exeter that many opportunities they’ll punish you, and they hurt us really badly with that today."

Owing to the Warriors players isolating with COVID-19, the club could not then field a side to play against Lyon and were handed a 28–0 loss by the EPCR, giving Lyon the five points for a bonus-point victory.

Shortly after this the French Government cancelled all matches by the French teams; and the competition was suspended.

It is set to continue but with two losses Glasgow Warriors will instead resume their European campaign in the Challenge Cup.

Pool

Results

Round 1

Round 2

Challenge Cup

Glasgow Warriors were drawn against Montpeillier in the Challenge Cup. As a Champions Cup side they joined the Challenge Cup in the last 16 stage. If they won that tie they would progress to a home quarter-final tie against the winners of the Benneton vs Agen match.

Unfortunately for the Warriors, the French side won out in a tight match, ending the Glasgow side's involvement in the tournament. For much of second half, Glasgow played with 14 men, after TJ Ioane was red-carded for a dangerous tackle on Montpelier's Yvan Reilhac. Ioane was to receive a 5 match ban.

Results

Last 16

Rainbow Cup

The Rainbow Cup was introduced this season as a precursor to inviting 4 South African Super Rugby Unlocked franchises to the Pro14 set-up. The South African sides Vodacom Bulls, Emirates Lions, Cell C Sharks and DHL Stormers were invited to a tournament with the remaining 12 northern hemisphere Pro14 sides. Former Pro14 sides Cheetahs and the Kings were noticeably absent: the Cheetahs were one of 3 remaining Super Rugby Unlocked franchises not invited, the others being the Griquas and the Pumas. The Kings had gone into voluntary liquidation in September 2020.

The original plan was for the European sides to play three matches against each other, the South African sides to play three matches against one another, and then the following three rounds would be European sides playing South African sides. This format was scrapped due to the coronavirus pandemic which still affected travel. A re-jigged format was then implemented. The European sides would play five matches against one another; the South African sides would play against one another; and the European group winners would play off against the South African group winners in a final. The Pro14 announced that the Rainbow Cup final would take place in Treviso, Italy.

With now only five matches instead of six, each of the European sides were given a bye in one of the rounds. Glasgow Warriors bye was in Round 6.

Table

Results

Round 1

Round 2 – 1872 Cup 3rd Leg

Round 3

Round 4

Round 5

Round 6

Warrior of the month awards

End-of-season awards

In a year hit by the COVID-19 pandemic and no domestic rugby played in Scotland outwith the international teams and Glasgow Warriors and Edinburgh Rugby, the Community Club of the Season award was replaced by a Community Hero of the Year Award, which was sponsored by SP Energy Networks. Instead of an awards dinner, the awards were notified online throughhout the week on social media.

References

2020-21
2020–21 in Scottish rugby union
2020–21 Pro14 by team
2020–21 European Rugby Champions Cup by team